Birchington East was a ward of Thanet Borough Council and was created in the boundary changes of 1979, and had previously been part of the Margate Birchington ward.

Councillors Dawson and Wanstall transferred from Margate Birchington ward and contested and won the 1979 election.

1979 Election

1983 Election

Thanet

1987 Election

1991 Election